Transmittance of the surface of a material is its effectiveness in transmitting radiant energy. It is the fraction of incident electromagnetic power that is transmitted through a sample, in contrast to the transmission coefficient, which is the ratio of the transmitted to incident electric field.

Internal transmittance refers to energy loss by absorption, whereas (total) transmittance is that due to absorption, scattering, reflection, etc.

Mathematical definitions

Hemispherical transmittance
Hemispherical transmittance of a surface, denoted T, is defined as

where
Φet is the radiant flux transmitted by that surface;
Φei is the radiant flux received by that surface.

Spectral hemispherical transmittance
Spectral hemispherical transmittance in frequency and spectral hemispherical transmittance in wavelength of a surface, denoted Tν and Tλ respectively, are defined as

where
Φe,νt is the spectral radiant flux in frequency transmitted by that surface;
Φe,νi is the spectral radiant flux in frequency received by that surface;
Φe,λt is the spectral radiant flux in wavelength transmitted by that surface;
Φe,λi is the spectral radiant flux in wavelength received by that surface.

Directional transmittance
Directional transmittance of a surface, denoted TΩ, is defined as

where
Le,Ωt is the radiance transmitted by that surface;
Le,Ωi is the radiance received by that surface.

Spectral directional transmittance
Spectral directional transmittance in frequency and spectral directional transmittance in wavelength of a surface, denoted Tν,Ω and Tλ,Ω respectively, are defined as

where
Le,Ω,νt is the spectral radiance in frequency transmitted by that surface;
Le,Ω,νi is the spectral radiance received by that surface;
Le,Ω,λt is the spectral radiance in wavelength transmitted by that surface;
Le,Ω,λi is the spectral radiance in wavelength received by that surface.

Beer–Lambert law

By definition, internal transmittance is related to optical depth and to absorbance as

where
τ is the optical depth;
A is the absorbance.

The Beer–Lambert law states that, for N attenuating species in the material sample,

or equivalently that

where
σi is the attenuation cross section of the attenuating species i in the material sample;
ni is the number density of the attenuating species i in the material sample;
εi is the molar attenuation coefficient of the attenuating species i in the material sample;
ci is the amount concentration of the attenuating species i in the material sample;
ℓ is the path length of the beam of light through the material sample.

Attenuation cross section and molar attenuation coefficient are related by

and number density and amount concentration by

where NA is the Avogadro constant.

In case of uniform attenuation, these relations become

or equivalently

Cases of non-uniform attenuation occur in atmospheric science applications and radiation shielding theory for instance.

Other radiometric coefficients

See also
Opacity (optics)

References

Physical quantities
Radiometry
Spectroscopy